The 1988–89 Southern Jaguars basketball team represented Southern University during the 1988–89 NCAA Division I men's basketball season. The Jaguars, led by head coach Ben Jobe, played their home games at the F. G. Clark Center and were members of the Southwestern Athletic Conference. They finished the season 20–11, 10–4 in SWAC play to finish in a tie for first place. They were champions of the SWAC tournament to earn an automatic bid to the 1989 NCAA tournament where they lost in the opening round to North Carolina.

Roster

Schedule

|-
!colspan=9 style=| Regular season

|-
!colspan=9 style=| 1989 SWAC tournament

|-
!colspan=9 style=|1989 NCAA tournament

References

Southern Jaguars basketball seasons
Southern
Southern
South
South